Expo 2027, the working title for a BIE recognised world's fair planned for 2027 or 2028, will be a specialised exposition. As such it must be at most three months in length and illustrate a specific theme. It could be held in 2027 or 2028.

Candidatures
Five countries have submitted competing candidatures to organise a Specialised Expo in either 2027 or 2028: the United States of America (in Minnesota), Thailand (in Phuket), Serbia (in Belgrade), Spain (in Malaga,), and Argentina (in San Carlos de Bariloche).

The candidature list closed on 28 January 2022. Each candidate submitted a detailed candidature dossier by 7 June 2022, and the BIE will then organise Enquiry Missions, assessing the feasibility and viability of each candidature project. The host country of Specialised Expo 2027/28 will then be elected by BIE Member States, gathered in a General Assembly set to take place in June 2023.

Minnesota
Minnesota had previously bid for Expo 2023 with Healthy People, Healthy Planet: Wellness and Well Being for All.

The theme for this bid for 2027 is Healthy People, Healthy Planet and would be held in Bloomington, Minnesota adjacent to the Mall of America and the Minnesota Valley National Wildlife Refuge, and close to Minneapolis-St. Paul International Airport. The expected number of visitors is 13.3 million.

Minnesota was the first to formally submit their bid on 29 July 2021. A group of BIE officials visited the site in October 2022 to hear presentations that included renderings of proposed structures for the expo.

Phuket
The theme for this bid for 2028 is Future of Life: Living in Harmony, Sharing Prosperity.

Belgrade
The theme for this bid for 2027 is Play for Humanity – Sport and Music for All.

Málaga
The theme for this bid for 2027 which would be called The Urban Era: towards the sustainable city intends to focus on the UN's sustainability goals.
If chosen it would be celebrated between 5 June and 5 September 2027.

It would take place in the Buenavista area within the Campanillas district
very near the University of Malaga and the Malaga International Airport that has a capacity for 35 million passengers every year.
It was the first city to be officially interested in hosting this expo and also the only city that was officially  visited by the BIE to examine the proposed terrane and learn more about the project before closing the candidatures.

Expo2027 Malaga has the support of a large part of institutions, entities, associations, federations and companies of the city.

San Carlos de Bariloche
The theme for this bid for 2027 is Nature + Technology = sustainable energy. A viable future for humanity.

References

2027
World's fairs in Europe
World's fairs in North America